HD 240429 (nicknamed Krios) and HD 240430 (Kronos) is a wide binary star system in the constellation of Cassiopeia. Both components of the system are yellow G-type main-sequence stars. HD 240430 is a Sun-like star in appearance, but it seems to have eaten its own planets, for which it is given the nickname Kronos, after the Greek god and the leader of the first generation of Titans. Its unusual properties were described by a team of astrophysicists at Princeton University in 2017, led by Semyeong Oh.

Kronos and Krios are about 350 light years away from Earth. Formed around four billion years ago, they originated from the same interstellar cloud. They are moving together through space and are assumed to orbit each other slowly, with an estimated period of about 10,000 years. Kronos has a higher abundance of elements such as lithium, magnesium and iron in its atmosphere than in that of Krios. They are the most chemically different binary stars to have been discovered to date. The unusual and rich chemical composition leads scientists to the conclusion that Kronos has destroyed many of its orbiting planets. According to estimates, it might have absorbed at least 15 Earth masses.

See also
 HD 134439/HD 134440

References

External links

Astronomical objects discovered in 2017
Cassiopeia (constellation)
Binary stars
G-type main-sequence stars
240429 30
240429 30